The Tour of Brotherly Love was a 2001 tour of North America featuring Oasis, The Black Crowes, and Spacehog, three rock bands featuring pairs of brothers: Noel and Liam Gallagher, Chris and Rich Robinson, Royston and Antony Langdon, respectively. The tour's title is a nod to the fact that all three pairs of brothers have been known to fight, sometimes physically, sometimes even publicly.

Originally scheduled for 21 dates across the United States and Canada, the three bands performed to capacity crowds in medium-sized arenas and concert halls, including a three-night stand at Radio City Music Hall in New York. Prior to the tour's two dates at The Greek Theatre in Los Angeles, The Black Crowes were inducted into the Guitar Center Rockwalk, a walk of fame honoring notable musical acts and artists. Noel Gallagher and Slash were on hand for the ceremony.

Noel Gallagher and Gem Archer of Oasis and the Langdon brothers of Spacehog joined The Black Crowes on stage at the end of most shows on the tour, performing covers of songs by Led Zeppelin, Fleetwood Mac, David Bowie, Pink Floyd and The Rolling Stones. Oasis drummer Alan White missed the tour with a thumb injury and was replaced by older brother Steve White, drummer for Paul Weller.

The May 24 date in Cincinnati, was canceled when the stage, backstage and pavilion of the Riverbend Music Center were flooded by forty-five feet of water from the rising Ohio River. The May 29 show in Pittsburgh, Pennsylvania was canceled because of the tour re-rerouting following the Cincinnati cancellation.

Setlists
Oasis
"Go Let It Out"
"Columbia"
"Morning Glory"
"Fade Away"
"Some Might Say"/"Acquiesce"
"Gas Panic!"
"Cigarettes & Alcohol"
"Step Out"
"Slide Away"
"Champagne Supernova"
"Don't Look Back In Anger"
"I Am the Walrus"

The Black Crowes
"Midnight From Inside The Owl"
"Greasy Grass River"
"Sting Me"
"Twice As Hard"
"Lickin'"
"Cursed Diamond"
"Soul Singing"
"My Morning Song"
"Young Old Man"
"Cosmic Friend"
"Remedy"
"Oh Well"

Tour dates

Videos
Black Crowes video from The Tour of Brotherly Love at the Greek Theatre in LA (5/15/2001)

Touring personnel (Black Crowes)

Band:
Chris Robinson – Vocals
Rich Robinson – Guitars, Vocals
Steve Gorman – Drums
Eddie Harsch – Keyboards
Audley Freed – Guitars
Andy Hess – Bass

Management:
Amy Finkle - Tour Manager
Urie Vega - Assistant Tour Manager
Stan Green - Production Manager/Lighting Designer
Ian Day - Stage Manager
Jeff Dunn - Sound Engineer (FOH)
Drew Consalvo - Sound Engineer (Monitors)
Richard Zimmer - Accountant

Crew:
Jeff Bertush - Lighting Technician/Operator 
Ian Dobson - Lighting Technician
Kathy Beer - Lighting Technician
Jim Keegan - Lighting Technician
Joseph Dougherty - Sound Technician
Randy Halsing - Sound Technician
Ed Dracoules - Sound Technician
Robert Miller - Sound Technician
Greg Howard - Technician
John "Noodles" Weber - Technician
Derek Phelps - Technician

References

2001 concert tours
Oasis (band) concert tours
The Black Crowes concert tours